This is a list of earthquakes in 1918. Only magnitude 6.0 or greater earthquakes appear on the list. Lower magnitude events are included if they have caused death, injury or damage. Events which occurred in remote areas will be excluded from the list as they wouldn't have generated significant media interest. All dates are listed according to UTC time. A couple of major events capped a fairly active year. The two major events came within weeks of each other. The largest was a magnitude 8.3 in the Philippines in August. In early September a magnitude 8.1 struck Russia. The deadliest event occurred in February in China when a magnitude 7.3 caused 2,000 deaths.

Overall

By death toll 

 Note: At least 10 casualties

By magnitude 

 Note: At least 7.0 magnitude

Notable events

January

February

April

May

June

July

August

September

October

November

December

References

1918
 
1918